Cortodera cubitalis is a species of longhorn beetle in the genus Cortodera.

References

Lepturinae
Beetles described in 1861